Rangrazan-e Olya (also Romanized as Rangrazān-e ‘Olyā; also known as Rang-i-Rāzān and Rangrazān) is a village in Qaedrahmat Rural District, Zagheh District, Khorramabad County, Lorestan Province, Iran. At the 2006 census, its population was 206, in 38 families.

References 

Towns and villages in Khorramabad County